The FIFA Development Award was an award given out by FIFA in 2008 and 2009 which was designed to exemplify the extraordinary amount of effort and financial support which go into increasing the development of football in those countries which need it most.

Winners

References
Creation of the FIFA Development Award

External links
FIFA World Cup 2022 All Matches Time

Development Award